John Anthony Randoll Blacking (22 October 1928 – 24 January 1990) was a British ethnomusicologist and social anthropologist.

Early life and education
John Blacking was born in Guildford, Surrey, and was educated at Salisbury Cathedral School and at King's College, Cambridge, where he was a pupil of the illustrious anthropologist, Meyer Fortes. After serving with the British Army in Malaysia, he was employed by Hugh Tracey in the International Library of African Music (ILAM) and further studied music and culture of the Venda people in South Africa in the 1950s and 1960s. In 1965 he was awarded a D.Litt. from the University of the Witwatersrand for his work on Venda children's songs.

Career
In 1965 he was made professor and Head of the Department of Social Anthropology.

In the field of ethnomusicology, Blacking is known for his early and energetic advocacy of an anthropological perspective in the study of music.

He spent most of his later academic career at Queen's University Belfast, in Northern Ireland, where he was professor of social anthropology from 1970 until his death in 1990. Many of his ideas about the social impact of music can be found in his 1973 book How Musical is Man?. In this book, Blacking called for a study of music as "Humanly Organized Sound", arguing that "it is the activities of Man the Music Maker that are of more interest and consequence to humanity than the particular musical achievements of Western man", and that "no musical style has 'its own terms': its terms are the terms of its society and culture".

His other books include Venda Children's Songs (1967), one of the first ethnomusicological works to focus directly on the interpenetration of music and culture, Anthropology of the Body (London: Academic Press, 1977) and A Commonsense View of All Music: reflections on Percy Grainger's contribution to ethnomusicology and music education (Cambridge: Cambridge University Press, 1989).

The Callaway Centre in University of Western Australia holds an archive of his field notes and tapes, the John Blacking Collection. He wrote and presented a series, Dancing, for Ulster Television. John Blacking House was named in Belfast, in honour of his involvement with the Open Door Housing Association.

He died in Belfast at age 62 on 24 January 1990.

Selected publications
 Blacking, John. 1954. Some notes on a theory of African rhythm advanced by Erich von Hornbostel. African Music: Journal of the International Library of African Music, Roodepoort, International Library of African Music, v. 1, n. 2, p. 12-20. . Available at: http://journal.ru.ac.za/index.php/africanmusic/article/view/251.
 Blacking, John. 1954. Eight flute tunes from Butembo, east Belgian Congo: an analysis in two parts, musical and physical: Part 1. African Music: Journal of the International Library of African Music, Roodepoort, International Library of African Music, v. 1, n. 2, p. 24-52. . Available at: http://journal.ru.ac.za/index.php/africanmusic/article/view/253.

References

Sources
Blacking, J. How Musical is Man? University of Washington Press, Seattle, U.S.A, 1973. 116p. 
Blacking, John Anthony Randoll (1928–1990), social anthropologist and ethnomusicologist, in Oxford Dictionary of National Biography, Oxford University Press, 2004 
Cross, Ian, (June 2007). Book review of The Musical Human: Rethinking John Blacking's Ethnomusicology in the Twenty-first Century (Aldershot, Ashgate, 2006.  ) in Music Perception 24:507-510 

1928 births
1990 deaths
Alumni of King's College, Cambridge
British anthropologists
British ethnomusicologists
People educated at Salisbury Cathedral School
20th-century anthropologists
20th-century British musicologists